The Arthur Rense Prize was established in 1998 when Paige Rense started the award of $20,000 in memory of her husband, the sportswriter and poet Arthur Rense. The prize is given triennially to an exceptional poet by the American Academy of Arts and Letters.

Winners

1999 — James McMichael
2002 — B.H. Fairchild
2005 — Daniel Hoffman
2008 — Hayden Carruth
2011 — David Wagoner
2023 — Shane McCrae

See also
 List of American literary awards
 List of literary awards
 American poetry
 List of poetry awards
 List of literary awards
 List of years in poetry
 List of years in literature

Notes

External links
 American Academy of Arts and Letters

American poetry awards
Awards established in 1998
Awards of the American Academy of Arts and Letters